Lakeside Murders is a Finnish crime drama and Nordic noir television series created by  and starring Eero Aho. The series is based on the Koskinen book series by Seppo Jokinen and follows Inspector Sakari Koskinen and his team in the Violent Crimes Unit as they try to solve murders in the Finnish lakeside city of Tampere.

Lakeside Murders is produced for Nelonen by Aito Media Oy. Filming of the series began in October 2020 in Tampere, Finland. The first season, which consisted of ten episodes, premiered in Finland on 29 November 2021 on Ruutu+ streaming service. Season two premiered on 15 June 2022. The series has been licensed to North America, Australia and Latvia.

Overview
The series follows Inspector Sakari Koskinen and his team in the Violent Crime Unit of the Central Finland Police Department in Tampere. Koskisen's diverse team includes Ulla Lundelin, a mother of three who treats alcohol stress; Risto Pekki, who uses Tinder diligently; and the passionate Ilves fan Markku Kaatio. Half a year has passed since the events of the first season. The bomb that exploded at the wedding of Luttinen and Taru has left its mark, and the author, Kai Hurme, has fled abroad, avoiding the police. During the season, Koskinen and the team will face a series of drownings, a series of strange persecutions in the neighborhood of Kaleva's "Great Wall of China", a cycle of exploitation and vengeful violence across the country, and the head of a man found on the stairs of Tampere City Hall.

Cast and characters

Main
 Eero Aho as Inspector Sakari Koskinen
 Maria Ylipää as Ulla Lundelin
  as Risto Pekki
  as Markku Kaatio

Recurring
  as Roine
  as Raija Koskinen
  as Antti Koskinen
 Mari Turunen as Tanse Niiranen
  as Hokka

Episodes

Season 1 (2021–2022)

Season 2 (2022)

See also
 Bordertown

References

External links
  (in Finnish)
 
 Lakeside Murders – Koskinen at LS-Distribution

2021 Finnish television series debuts
2020s crime television series
Finnish drama television series
2020s Finnish television series
Finnish police procedural television series
Television shows based on novels